Stand Up is 2008 British film about stand up comedy, written and directed by Joseph Pierce. It features Paul Putner and Daniel Rigby.

External links
 

2008 films
2008 comedy films
British comedy films
2000s English-language films
2000s British films